Monoctenocera is a genus of snout moths described by George Hampson in 1899.

Species
 Monoctenocera brachiella Hampson in Ragonot, 1898
 Monoctenocera leucania (C. Felder, R. Felder & Rogenhofer, 1875)

References

Anerastiini
Pyralidae genera